Lustdriven is the fourth and final studio album by Heavy Metal band Kiuas. It was released March 31, 2010 by Spinefarm Records.

Track listing

Personnel
 Ilja Jalkanen – vocals
 Mikko Salovaara – guitars, vocals
 Markku Näreneva – drums
 Atte Tanskanen – keyboard
 Teemu Tuominen – bass guitar

References

2010 albums
Kiuas albums
Spinefarm Records albums